Drake vs. Lil Wayne was a co-headlining concert tour by Canadian recording artist and rapper Drake and American rapper Lil Wayne. The tour is based on the fighting game Street Fighter, and supported by Capcom, the game's creator. Each concert pits both rappers in a battle against each other in a Street Fighter-style battle to determine who is "the best rapper in the world".

Opening acts
YG
Yo Gotti
PartyNextDoor
G-Eazy
iLoveMakonnen

Set list
The app allows fans to choose which artist performs first. The winner is chosen after the battle.
This setlist is representative of the first show in Darien Lake, New York. It does not represent all concerts for the duration of the entire tour.

Opening:

"Blunt Blowin"
"We Be Steady Mobbin'"
"Draft Day"
"We Made It"
"The Language"

Lil Wayne:

"Mr. Carter"
"Money on My Mind"
"D'usse"
"Da Sky Is Da Limit"

Drake:

"Headlines"
"Up All Night"
"Over"
"Crew Love"

Lil Wayne:

"Go DJ"
"Pop Bottles"
"Hustler Musik"
"Leather So Soft"
"Drop the World"

Drake:

"Pop That"
"All Me"
"Versace (remix)"
"Own It"
"Find Your Love"
"Marvin's Room"
"Hold On, We're Going Home"

Lil Wayne:

"How to Love"
"I'm Single"
"Mrs. Officer"
"Every Girl"
"Lollipop"
"Make It Rain"

Drake:

"I'm on One" (Both)
"No New Friends"
"Love Me" (Both)

Rap battle:

"Bandz a Make Her Dance" – Lil Wayne
"No Lie" – Drake
"Duffle Bag Boy" – Lil Wayne
"Loyal" – Lil Wayne
"Who Do You Love" – Drake
"6 Foot 7 Foot" – Lil Wayne
"Rich As Fuck" – Lil Wayne
"Trophies" – Drake
"Started from the Bottom" – Drake
"No Worries" – Lil Wayne
"A Milli" – Lil Wayne
"0 to 100" – Drake
"Worst Behavior" – Drake

Drake and Lil Wayne:

"The Motto" (Both)
"Grindin'" (Both)
"Believe Me" (Both)
"HYFR" (Both)

Shows
Lil Wayne was the opener for every concert.

Drake won with 15 wins against Lil Wayne with 10.

Notes
A  The concert on September 17 in Wheatland, California was canceled due to scheduling conflicts.

References

External links
The Drake Vs Lil Wayne Setlist Is 51 Songs Of HYFR

2014 concert tours
Co-headlining concert tours
Drake (musician) concert tours
Lil Wayne